Hazley is a surname. Notable people with the surname include:

Matthew Hazley (born 1987), Northern Irish footballer
Ray Hazley (born  1959), Irish Gaelic footballer and hurler

See also 
Haisley (given name)